Vanto may refer to:
The Vanto Group, the parent company of Landmark Worldwide
Eli Vanto, a character first appearing in the novel Star Wars: Thrawn